Joint Base McGuire–Dix–Lakehurst (JB MDL) is a United States military facility located  southeast of Trenton, New Jersey. The base is the only tri-service base in the United States Department of Defense and includes units from all six armed forces branches.

The facility is an amalgamation of the United States Air Force's McGuire Air Force Base, the United States Army's Fort Dix and the United States Navy's Naval Air Engineering Station Lakehurst, which were merged on 1 October 2009.

It was established in accordance with congressional legislation implementing the recommendations of the 2005 Base Realignment and Closure Commission. The legislation ordered the consolidation of the three facilities which were adjoining, but separate military installations, into a single joint base, one of 12 formed in the United States as a result of the law.

The installation commander is Air Force Colonel B. Wesley Adams.

Overview
The 42,000-contiguous acres of JB MDL are home to more than 80 mission partners and 40 mission commanders providing a wide range of combat capability. The base spans more than 20 miles, from east to west. It is situated in the two largest counties in New Jersey, Burlington and Ocean, and includes portions of eight municipalities: the borough of Wrightstown and the townships of New Hanover, North Hanover, Pemberton, and Springfield, in Burlington County, and the townships of Jackson, Manchester, and Plumsted in Ocean County. The 87th Air Base Wing provides installation management support for 3,933 facilities with an approximate value of $9.3 billion in physical infrastructure. More than 44,000 airmen, soldiers, sailors, marines, Coast Guardsmen, civilians, and their family members live and work on and around JB MDL, which has an economic impact on the state of New Jersey.

McGuire/McGuire AFB
 See: McGuire Air Force Base for additional information and history.
The base originated in 1941 as Fort Dix Army Air Force Base. Closed briefly after World War II, it reopened in 1948 as McGuire Air Force Base. The base was named after Major Thomas B. McGuire, Jr., Medal of Honor recipient, and the second leading ace in American history.

McGuire grew famous as the Air Force's "Gateway to the East", when its core mission became global mobility in 1945. In 1992, it became part of the newly reorganized Air Mobility Command.

The 305th Air Mobility Wing served as the host wing from October 1994 to March 2009, when the newly activated 87th Air Base Wing assumed installation command. The 305th, along with the 108th Air Wing (ANG), 621st Contingency Response Wing, and the 514th Air Mobility Wing (AFRES),  has supported every major type of air mobility mission over the past 15 years.

McGuire organizations 
 87th Air Base Wing  (Host organization for JB MDL)
 305th Air Mobility Wing (C-17 Airlift, KC-10 Air Refueling operations for McGuire AFB/Lakehurst)
 621st Contingency Response Wing (Rapid Response unit)
 514th Air Mobility Wing (C-17 Airlift, KC-10 Air Refueling) (Air Force Reserve)
 108th Wing  (KC-135 Air Refueling, C-32B) (Air National Guard)
 57th Weapons Squadron (USAF Weapons School C-17 training unit, GSU from Nellis AFB, Nevada)
 314th Recruiting Squadron
 Detachment 1, Civil Air Patrol
 Detachment 1, 373rd Training Squadron
Source:

Dix 
 See: Fort Dix for additional information and history.
The facility originated in 1917 as Camp Dix, named in honor of Major General John Adams Dix, a veteran of the War of 1812 and the Civil War, and a former United States Senator, Secretary of the Treasury and Governor of New York. It was renamed Fort Dix in 1939.

Dix has a history of mobilizing, training and demobilizing Soldiers from as early as World War I  through the present day. In 1978, the first female recruits entered basic training at Fort Dix. In 1991, Dix trained Kuwaiti civilians in basic military skills so they could take part in their country's liberation.

Dix ended its active Army training mission in 1988 due to Base Realignment and Closure Commission recommendations. It began a new mission of mobilizing, deploying and demobilizing Soldiers and providing training areas for Army Reserve and Army National Guard Soldiers.

In 1994, the United States Air Force Expeditionary Center was established as the Air Mobility Warfare Center on Dix.

Fort Dix organizations

 Army Support Activity
 Marine Aircraft Group 49
 99th Regional Support Command
 404th Civil Affairs Battalion (Airborne) 
 2d Brigade, 75th Division
 USCG Atlantic Strike Team
 U.S. Air Force Expeditionary Center
 Military Entrance Processing Station
 NCO Academy
 Navy Operational Support Center
 174th Infantry Brigade
 Fleet Logistics Squadron (VR-64)
244th Aviation Brigade
 Battery G, 3rd Battalion, 14th Marine Regiment
Joint Force Headquarters (JFHQ), NJARNG
NJARNG Observer Coach/Trainer Operations Group

Source:

Lakehurst 
 See: Naval Air Engineering Station Lakehurst for additional information and history.

Lakehurst history begins as a munitions-testing site for the Imperial Russian Army in 1916. It was then gained by the United States Army as Camp Kendrick during World War I. The United States Navy purchased the property in 1921 for use as an airship station and renamed it Naval Air Station Lakehurst.

The Navy's lighter-than-air program was conducted at Lakehurst through the 1930s. It was the site of the 1937 LZ 129 Hindenburg airship disaster.  During World War II, anti-submarine patrol blimps were operated from Lakehurst. Since the 1950s, Aviation Boatswain's Mates have been trained at Lakehurst to operate catapults and arresting systems on aircraft carriers. Lakehurst conducts the unique mission of supporting and developing the Aircraft Launch and Recovery Equipment and Support Equipment for naval aviation. The Electromagnetic Aircraft Launch System and the Advanced Arresting Gear system that will replace the existing steam catapults and the Mk-7 arresting gear are being developed and tested at Lakehurst at full-scale shipboard representative test facilities here.

Lakehurst organizations 
 NAVAIR
 NAWCAD
 Center for Naval Educational Training, CNATT
 Naval Mobile Construction Battalion 21 (NMCB 21)
 Army 1st Brigade Mid-Atlantic Recruiting Battalion
 EAGLE FLAG
 1st Battalion (Assault), 150th Aviation Regiment, NJARNG
Source:

History
The Hindenburg disaster took place on Thursday, May 6, 1937, as the German passenger airship LZ 129 Hindenburg caught fire and was destroyed during its attempt to dock with its mooring mast at the Lakehurst Naval Air Station.

Education
The U.S. Census Bureau lists "Joint Base McGuire-Dix-Lakehurst" in Burlington County as having its own school district. Students attend area school district public schools, as the Department of Defense Education Activity (DoDEA) does not operate any schools on the joint base. Students in Lakehurst are zoned to Lakehurst School District and Manchester Township High School (of Manchester Township School District). Students on McGuire and Dix may attend one of the following, with all siblings in a family taking the same choice: North Hanover Township School District (Pre-Kindergarten through grade 6), Northern Burlington County Regional School District (grades 7-12), and Pemberton Township School District (K-12).

References

External links

 

Go.MDL.com – 87th Force Support Squadron

Buildings and structures in Burlington County, New Jersey
Buildings and structures in Ocean County, New Jersey
Joint bases of the U.S. Department of Defense
Military installations in New Jersey
2009 establishments in New Jersey
Wrightstown, New Jersey
New Hanover Township, New Jersey
North Hanover Township, New Jersey
Pemberton Township, New Jersey
Springfield Township, Burlington County, New Jersey
Jackson Township, New Jersey
Manchester Township, New Jersey
Plumsted Township, New Jersey